Dolna Ǵonovica is a village in the municipality of Gostivar, North Macedonia.

Name
The name stems from the Albanian name Gjon plus the Slavic suffix ov/ica.

Demographics
As of the 2021 census, Dolna Ǵonovica had 35 residents with the following ethnic composition:
Albanians 22
Persons for whom data are taken from administrative sources 8
Macedonians 5

According to the 2002 census, the village had a total of 242 inhabitants. Ethnic groups in the village include:

Albanians 239
Others 3

References

External links

Villages in Gostivar Municipality
Albanian communities in North Macedonia